Pannonia Secunda was one of the provinces of the Roman Empire. It was formed in the year 296, during the reign of emperor Diocletian. The capital of the province was Sirmium (today Sremska Mitrovica). Pannonia Secunda included parts of present-day Serbia, Croatia, and Bosnia and Herzegovina.

History

Before the creation of this province, its territory was part of the province of Pannonia Inferior. In the year 296, Pannonia Inferior was divided into two provinces - Pannonia Secunda in the south and Pannonia Valeria in the north. The border between the two newly established provinces was the River Drava.

The capital of Pannonia Secunda, Sirmium, was also one of the four capitals of the Roman Empire; several Roman emperors were born in or near this city.

In the year 314, there was a battle between two pretenders to the imperial throne, Constantine the Great and Licinius. The battle occurred in Pannonia Secunda, near the town of Cibalae. Constantine had an army of 20,000 men, while Licinius had 35,000. The battle lasted for the whole day and Constantine was victorious.

During the 5th century, the province was raided several times, by migrating peoples, including Huns and Goths. During the 6th century, the territory was contested between the Ostrogoths, Gepids, Langobards, Avars, and the Byzantine Empire.

Cities

Besides Sirmium, the other cities in Pannonia Secunda were: 
Mursa (today Osijek)
Certissa (today Đakovo)
Marsonia (today Slavonski Brod)
Cibalae (today Vinkovci)
Bassianae (today Donji Petrovci)
Cuccium (today Ilok)
Saldae (today Posavski Podgajci)
Teutoburgium (today Dalj)

Prefects
Among the prefects of Pannonia Secunda:
Aprikanus (355)
Mesala (373)
Aurelius Victor, prefect of Pannonia Secunda under Emperor Julian.

See also
 Pannonia
 Pannonia Inferior
 Pannonia Valeria
 Diocese of Pannonia
 Pannonia (Byzantine province)
 Theme of Sirmium

References

Literature

External links
 Map of western Illyricum
 Map of Pannonia Secunda, Moesia Prima and Dardania

Late Roman provinces
Croatia in the Roman era
Serbia in the Roman era
Illyricum (Roman province)
Bosnia and Herzegovina in the Roman era
Ancient history of Vojvodina
History of Syrmia
Secunda
Pannonia Inferior
States and territories established in the 290s
290s establishments in the Roman Empire
296 establishments
5th-century disestablishments in the Roman Empire
States and territories disestablished in the 5th century